A digital comparator or magnitude comparator is a hardware electronic device that takes two numbers as input in binary form and determines whether one  number is greater than, less than or equal to the other number. Comparators are used in central processing units (CPUs) and microcontrollers (MCUs). Examples of digital comparator include the CMOS 4063 and 4585 and the TTL 7485 and 74682.

An XNOR gate is a basic comparator, because its output is "1" only if its two input bits are equal.

The analog equivalent of digital comparator is the voltage comparator.  Many microcontrollers have analog comparators on some of their inputs that can be read or trigger an interrupt.

Implementation

Consider two 4-bit binary numbers A and B so

Here each subscript represents one of the digits in the numbers.

Equality
The binary numbers A and B will be equal if all the pairs of significant digits of both numbers are equal, i.e.,

Since the numbers are binary, the digits are either 0 or 1 and the boolean function for equality of any two digits  and  can be expressed as

 we can also replace it by XNOR gate in digital electronics.

For the equality of A and B, all  variables (for i=0,1,2,3) must be 1.

So the equality condition of A and B can be implemented using the AND operation as

The binary variable (A=B) is 1 only if all pairs of digits of the two numbers are equal.

Inequality

In order to manually determine the greater of two binary numbers, we inspect the relative magnitudes of pairs of significant digits, starting from the most significant bit, gradually proceeding towards lower significant bits until an inequality is found. When an inequality is found, if the corresponding bit of A is 1 and that of B is 0 then we conclude that A>B.

This sequential comparison can be expressed logically as:

(A>B) and (A < B) are output binary variables, which are equal to 1 when A>B or A<B respectively.

See also 
 List of LM-series integrated circuits
 4000 series, List of 4000 series integrated circuits
 7400 series, List of 7400 series integrated circuits
 Sorting network

External links 
Digital Comparators by Texas Instruments

Digital circuits